Alinguata is a genus of moths in the family Alucitidae containing only one species Alinguata neblina, which is found in Venezuela.

References

Alucitidae
Ditrysia genera
Monotypic moth genera
Moths of South America